Tim Dunn may refer to:

Tim Dunn (businessman) (born 1955), American businessman
Tim Dunn (historian) (born 1981), British historian
Tim Dunn (politician), American politician